The 2017–18 Virginia Cavaliers men's basketball team represented the University of Virginia during the 2017–18 NCAA Division I men's basketball season. The team was led by head coach Tony Bennett in his ninth year, and played their home games at John Paul Jones Arena in Charlottesville, Virginia as members of the Atlantic Coast Conference.

In a year with low expectations from the press, the Cavaliers began unranked but ascended all the way to the No. 1 ranking in the AP Poll for the first time since December 1982. The team then held on to that ranking through the end of the regular season and became the first ACC team to win 17 conference games. The Cavaliers won the ACC tournament by handily defeating Louisville 75–58, Clemson 64–58, and North Carolina 71–63 in the championship game. In the process the team broke the school's single-season win record, which had twice been tied by Bennett-led teams in the past five years.

ACC Sixth Man of the Year De'Andre Hunter broke his wrist in the ACC Tournament victory, and was announced to be out for the NCAA tournament two days before it began. UVA entered as the No. 1 overall seed, placed in the South regional, but suffered an upset in the first round to UMBC and became the first No. 1 seed to lose to a No. 16 seed since the field expanded to 64 teams in 1985. The first round losses by No. 1 seed Virginia and No. 4 seed Arizona, and second round losses by No. 2 seed Cincinnati and No. 3 seed Tennessee, led to the South Region becoming the first ever to not advance any of its top four seeds to the Sweet Sixteen.

Nevertheless, for taking an unranked team to finish four games above pre-season AP No. 1 ranked Duke and winning the ACC Tournament over North Carolina, Bennett was awarded his third Henry Iba Award for the nation's top coach of the season.

Previous season
The Cavaliers finished the 2016–17 season 23–11, and 11–7 in ACC play to tie Duke for fifth place. They defeated Pittsburgh in the second round of the ACC tournament to advance to the quarterfinals where they lost to Notre Dame. The Wahoos received an at-large bid to the NCAA tournament as the No. 5 seed in the East region. There they defeated No. 12 UNC Wilmington in the First Round before losing in the Second Round to No. 4 Florida.

Offseason

Departures

Incoming transfers

2017 recruiting class

2018 recruiting class

Roster

Depth chart

Schedule and results 

|-
!colspan=12 style=| Non-conference regular season

|-
!colspan=12 style=""| ACC Regular Season

|-
!colspan=12 style=| ACC Tournament

|-

|-
!colspan=12 style=| NCAA tournament

Rankings

*AP does not release post-NCAA tournament rankings.Coaches did not release a Week 2 poll at the same time the AP did.

References

Notes 

Virginia Cavaliers men's basketball seasons
Virginia
Virginia Cavaliers men's basketball
2017 in sports in Virginia
Virginia